Into the Depths is the second solo album by Mark Rae, the DJ, musician and boss of Grand Central Records, following his first album, Rae Road. Rae has also released two studio albums, two DJ mix albums and a remix album with the producer Steve Christian.

Track listing
 "Into The Depths"
 "Mind, Body and Soul"
 "Without You Now" (featuring Veba)
 "Medicine" (featuring Pete Simpson)
 "Rise Up"
 "Reach Out To Me" (featuring Veba)
 "Put It Back Together"
 "Clip My Wings" (featuring Veba)
 "Depth Charge"
 "Gato" (featuring Pete Simpson)
 "San Francisco"

See also
Rae & Christian

Grand Central Records albums
Mark Rae albums
2004 albums